Wolfgang Dahmen (born 19 October 1949) is a German mathematician working in approximation theory, numerical analysis, and partial differential equations. In 2002, he was awarded the Gottfried Wilhelm Leibniz Prize and in 2011 the Gauss Lectureship. He was also a taekwondo athlete. He has been the Chair of the Society for the Foundations of Computational Mathematics (2014–).

In 2019, he was named a SIAM Fellow "for contributions to numerical methods for partial differential equations, signal processing, and learning".

References

Further reading
Multiscale, Nonlinear and Adaptive Approximation: Dedicated to Wolfgang Dahmen on the Occasion of His 60th Birthday, Ronald DeVore, Angela Kunoth, Springer, 2009, 
Homepage at Institut für Geometrie und Praktische Mathematik

20th-century German mathematicians
21st-century German mathematicians
Living people
German male taekwondo practitioners
1949 births
Fellows of the Society for Industrial and Applied Mathematics
World Taekwondo Championships medalists